Crüger, sometimes spelt in English and other languages Crueger, may refer to:

People
Arved Crüger (1911–1942), World War II Luftwaffe wing commander and Knight's Cross of the Iron Cross recipient
Carl Friedrich August Alexander Crüger (1813–1885), German entomologist
Herbert Crüger (1911–2003), German political activist and politician
Hermann Crüger (1818–1864), German pharmacist and botanist
Johann Crüger (1598–1662), a Sorb musician and composer 
Peter Crüger (1580–1639), Prussian mathematician and astronomer

Other
Crüger (crater), a crater on the Moon

See also
Cruger (disambiguation)
Kruger